Nezamabad (also Romanized as Nez̧amābād, Nez̧āmābād, Naz̧mābād, and Naz̧mābād) is a village in Mashiz Rural District, in the Central District of Bardsir County, Kerman Province, Iran. At the 2006 census, its population was 36, in 8 families.

References 

Populated places in Bardsir County